David Carson (born 20 September 1995) is an English footballer who plays as a midfielder for Inverness Caledonian Thistle in the Scottish Championship.

Career
Born in Newcastle-upon-Tyne, Carson spent his early career with Ashington. In 2014, Carson signed for Blackburn Rovers He returned to non-league, playing with South Shields, Whitby Town and Morpeth Town.

On 15 May 2019, Carson signed for Scottish Championship side Inverness Caledonian Thistle. He said he was hoping to be successful at the club, and new Inverness manager John Robertson tipped him for success.

Honours

Individual 

 Scottish Championship Player of the Month: March 2021

References

1995 births
Living people
Footballers from Newcastle upon Tyne
English footballers
Ashington A.F.C. players
Blackburn Rovers F.C. players
Whitby Town F.C. players
Morpeth Town A.F.C. players
Inverness Caledonian Thistle F.C. players
Northern Premier League players
Scottish Professional Football League players
Association football midfielders